is a river in Hokkaidō, Japan. The Kushiro originates from Lake Kussharo and flows south across the Kushiro Plain. The river is joined by two tributaries, the Kuchoro River and the Setsuri River, before it empties into the Pacific Ocean at the port at Kushiro. The lower reaches of the river form broad wetlands. The Shinkushiro River, which was built roughly parallel to the Kushiro River, was completed in 1931 and flows south to the Pacific Ocean.

References

Rivers of Hokkaido
Rivers of Japan